Saleem "Serius Jones" Bligen (born December 25, 1982) is an American rapper from New Jersey who is widely known for his freestyle battles. Jones won 12 consecutive battles at New York's Monday Night Fight Klub before facing and beating former Fight Klub King Jin The MC to become MTV's all-time Fight Klub Champion. Jones independently released King Me in 2006, followed by Serius Bizness in 2008 and Why So Serius? in 2009.

Name
Jones chose the name "Serius" from a book on Egyptian phenomena, the star Sirius was extremely important to the Egyptians, lining up with the Pyramid of Giza.

Career

Battle rap career
His most known battles are Jones vs. Jin, Jones vs. Big Ace, which both appeared on MTV 2's Fight Klub, and also Jones vs. Murda Mook which appeared on a SMACK DVD, and also received over one million views youtube.com, Vlad TV, World Star Hip Hop.com and more.

Deal with Disturbing Tha Peace Records
Serius Jones signed a record deal with rapper Ludacris's Disturbing tha Peace record label in 2006 but 18 months later Serius and DTP parted ways. In an interview with HipHopDX.com, Serius stated,

The hospitality in the beginning was really there. But I think after a while people just got annoyed of me, and sick of me. It's like, this gotdamn Serius Jones guy. He keeps going. He's not stopping and just settling in like everybody else. And it's like, no muthafucka I'm not stopping and allowing myself to be [content] with riding in the fuckin promo van. Like, nah B, this is rap star shit. Cause if it ain't, and if you ain't no fuckin rap star, you just some other little dusty rap nigga with a chain trying to be noticed. And that ain't never been my style. It's all love though, on my end, he said. I don't have nothing but good wishes for them. I wish them all the best. In terms of being people, in terms of character, I don't think they had any malice towards me. But it's a business.

Jones has also stated that:

I heard stuff that supposedly I'm a head case, he said. I'm supposedly a diva. Like, I think my shit don't stink and all this. Look man, if anybody know me, and if anybody has followed anything about me, they know that I'm a humble dude with it when it comes to me not being on stage, when it comes to me not being a rapper. A star is supposed to shine [though]. [And] I'm not turning my shine off because people are uncomfortable about it. I can't do that. I can't afford to do that. I gotta feed people. I gotta eat and at the end of the day, I'm on a mission.

Life is Serius
Between 2006 and 2010, Jones produced and starred in a short autobiography film entitled Life is Serius, directed by acclaimed Independent Filmmaker/Producer Winfield Ezell, Jr.  Jones also put out nearly 50 records, 100 music videos, short films, comedy sketches and an animated series "Day In The life" staying relevant online and in the blogs. Jones headlined a tour through Europe while filming a documentary of the experience entitled "The Euro Tour" and recording an album of the same name, including 2 music videos filmed in Rome.

2011-present: Offer From Luxe Society Records, Living Legend and Legendary 
Jones is released Serius Business 2 on Thanksgiving in 2011. The EP features appearances by 2 Chainz, Gucci Mane, T-Pain, Bobby V, Sam Scarfo, and Jay Rock.  In May 2012 Serius Jones was offered a deal with recently funded indie label Luxe Society Records. Nothing materialized from the offer and no music was ever released.

After a return to battle rap, Serius Jones will release his mixtape Living Legend on February 18, 2014, and follow up with his Legendary album in April of the same year. In conjunction with Serius Jones, the Jersey Mint Records, a New Jersey-based indie record label, was scheduled to release the album but the project was never released.

Since his battle rap return in 2012 to date (April 2017) Serius Jones is "arguably" undefeated, most recently battling Battle Rap star Dizaster on KOTD.

Arrest
Jones was convicted and sentenced to three years for pimping, dissuading a witness, and other charges in October 2020.

Discography

Videography
 Serius Jones Presents Life is Serius (2012)

References

Further reading

External links
 Official Website 
  Serius Jones at the Luxe Society Records Website
 Serius Jones battle rap profile on Rap Grid
 Serius Jones channel at YouTube

1982 births
Living people
People from Englewood, New Jersey
African-American male rappers
Rappers from New Jersey
East Coast hip hop musicians
Underground rappers
21st-century American rappers
21st-century American male musicians
21st-century African-American musicians
20th-century African-American people